A by-election was held in the federal riding of Burnaby South on February 25, 2019 following the resignation of incumbent New Democratic MP Kennedy Stewart on September 14, 2018.

Jagmeet Singh, the federal leader of the NDP since October 1, 2017, won the by-election after having served as his party's leader without a seat in the House of Commons for over a year.

Background

Riding profile 
The riding of Burnaby South was created by the 2012 federal electoral boundaries redistribution and was first contested in the 2015 federal election.

Demographics 
According to the 2016 Canadian Census, Chinese Canadians make up a plurality of the riding's population, while a majority of the riding's population speaks a mother tongue that is neither English nor French.

Resignation of Kennedy Stewart 

On May 10, incumbent MP Kennedy Stewart publicly revealed that he was considering a run for mayor of Vancouver in the city's 2018 elections. Stewart formally confirmed his candidacy for Vancouver mayor on May 14, announcing that he would resign his seat in Parliament before the election.

Candidate nominations

Conservative

Liberal

NDP

People's 
The People's Party of Canada announced Laura-Lynn Tyler Thompson as their party's candidate for the by-election on January 8, 2019. She had previously been a host on the Canadian edition of The 700 Club and had earlier run to be a trustee on the Burnaby Board of Education in November of the previous year.

Independent candidacies 
Valentine Wu, who was the BC Greens candidate in the 2017 provincial election for the riding of Burnaby-Edmonds, announced on January 17, 2019 that he would contest the by-election.

Non-contesting parties 
The Green Party had previously promised not to run a candidate against Jagmeet Singh if he were to run in a by-election. Green Party Leader Elizabeth May reiterated the party's plans to give Singh "leader's courtesy" on August 16 after he announced his candidacy.

Although the Libertarian Party had announced on its blog the selection of Rex Brocki as their candidate, he did not register and ultimately did not appear on the ballot.

Results

See also 

 By-elections to the 42nd Canadian Parliament

References 

2019 elections in Canada
Burnaby_South_federal_by-election
Federal by-elections in British Columbia
Politics of Burnaby